Cecilia Yip Tung (born 8 March 1963) is a Hong Kong actress whose work is known throughout Asia, especially in mainland China, Hong Kong and Taiwan.

Career
She began her acting career in 1982 with Nomad for which she was nominated for the Best New Performer Award. She won the Hong Kong Film Award for Best Actress in 1984. Yip has starred in 45 feature-length films, receiving several nominations and awards. In addition to film, Yip has expanded her acting to television and was nominated for the 30th Taiwan Golden Bell Best Actress Award for her performance in the 1993 television series The Heaven Sword and Dragon Saber. She also played the lead role in four stage plays.

Filmography

Television series

Films

References

External links
 
 

 

1962 births
Living people
20th-century Hong Kong actresses
21st-century Hong Kong actresses
TVB actors